The Presbyterian Church in Korea HapDongBoSu I was created in 1974 as a division in the Presbyterian Church in Korea (DongShin). The next year, BoSu I adopted a new constitution. For many years BoSu welcomed pastors from many other denominations. In recent year 60 churches withdrew and joined other denominations. In 2004 it had more than 10,700 members and 92 congregations with 89 ordained clergy. The Apostles Creed and Westminster Confession are adopted.

References

Presbyterian denominations in South Korea
Presbyterian denominations in Asia